Berrywood Hospital is a modern psychiatric hospital on the outskirts of Duston, Northampton. It is managed by Northamptonshire Healthcare NHS Foundation Trust.

History
The hospital, which was built in the grounds of the former St Crispin's Hospital, opened in May 2010. It has inpatient mental health services for adults and older people, an assessment and treatment unit for people with learning disabilities, and a low secure unit.

References

External links
 Hospital's website

Hospital buildings completed in 2010
Hospitals established in 2010
Hospitals in Northamptonshire
Psychiatric hospitals in England
NHS hospitals in England